Gloria Thato is a South African football winger. She plays for University of Pretoria and the South Africa women's national football team.

Playing career

International
In March 2013, Thato was called up to the national team to represent South Africa at the 2013 Cyprus Cup. During the team's first match of the tournament, Thato's two assists helped South Africa defeat Northern Ireland 2–1.

In September 2014, Thato was named to the roster for the 2014 African Women's Championship in Namibia.

References

External links
 South Africa player profile
 University of Pretoria player profile

Living people
1989 births
Women's association football wingers
South African women's soccer players
South Africa women's international soccer players